Sacré-Coeur is a municipality in the Côte-Nord region of the province of Quebec in Canada.

Demographics
Population trend:
 Population in 2011: 1881 (2006 to 2011 population change: -7.1%)
 Population in 2006: 2024
 Population in 2001: 2053
 Population in 1996: 2081
 Population in 1991: 1992

Private dwellings occupied by usual residents: 745 (total dwellings: 836)

Mother tongue:
 English as first language: 0%
 French as first language: 99.5%
 English and French as first language: 0%
 Other as first language: 0.5%

See also
 List of municipalities in Quebec

References

External links

Municipalities in Quebec
Incorporated places in Côte-Nord
La Haute-Côte-Nord Regional County Municipality